Dawn of Revenge is a 1922 American silent drama film directed by Bernard Sievel and starring Richard Travers, Muriel Kingston and Charles E. Graham.

Cast
 Richard Travers as Judson Hall 
 Muriel Kingston as Sherry Miles
 Charles E. Graham as Ace Hall
 Florence Foster as Alice Blake Miles
 Louis Dean as Nelson Miles
 May Daggert as Baba

References

Bibliography
 Munden, Kenneth White. The American Film Institute Catalog of Motion Pictures Produced in the United States, Part 1. University of California Press, 1997.

External links
 

1922 films
1922 drama films
1920s English-language films
American silent feature films
Silent American drama films
American black-and-white films
1920s American films